Akudo Oguaghamba is a Nigerian human rights activist and educator. She has published articles on LGBTQ+ and gender rights. She's the founder for Women's Health and Equal Rights WHER and was also a co-chair (Female) of PAN-AFRICAN ILGA (International Lesbian, Gay, Bisexual, Trans and Intersex Association). Oguaghamba is an alumnus of University of Nigeria, Nsuuka and EQUITAS – International Centre for Human Rights and has over eleven years leadership and project management experience.

References 

Living people
Residents of Lagos
Nigerian LGBT writers
Nigerian LGBT rights activists
Year of birth missing (living people)
21st-century Nigerian LGBT people